Pasur may refer to:

 Pasur (card game), a card game
 Pasur, Erode, a town in India
 Pasur, Coimbatore, a town in India

See also:
Pasrur, a city in Pakistan